Francis Noel Ashley  (1884–1976) was a British colonial administrator. He served as the Resident Commissioner of Southern Provinces of Nigeria from 1924 until 1928, and as Resident Commissioner of the Solomon Islands between 1929 and 1939.

Biography
Ashley was born in 1884 and attended Westminster School. He joined the Royal Sussex Militia Artillery in 1902, before transferring to the Cape Colonial Mounted Forces in 1904. In 1908 he joined the Nigerian political service as a cadet, where he remained until starting service with the West African Frontier Force in 1915. In 1913 he married Marjorie Robinson; the couple had one daughter.

In 1924 he was appointed Resident Commissioner of the Southern Provinces of Nigeria. He remained in post until 1928, and the following year he became Resident Commissioner of the Solomon Islands. He was made a Companion of the Order of St Michael and St George (CMG) in the 1937 Coronation Honours.

He went on leave from his post in April 1939. In 1940 he joined the Royal Air Force Volunteer Reserve, serving as a Squadron Leader until 1944. Between 1944 and 1946 he worked for the government of the Bahamas.

References

1884 births
People educated at Westminster School, London
Cape Colony army officers
Royal West African Frontier Force officers
People from colonial Nigeria
British colonial governors and administrators in Africa
Governors of the Solomon Islands
Companions of the Order of St Michael and St George
Royal Air Force Volunteer Reserve personnel of World War II
Colony of the Bahamas people
1976 deaths